The Château de la Mignarde is a listed château in Aix-en-Provence.

Location
It is located on the Route des Pinchinats on the Northern outskirts of Aix-en-Provence.

History
It was built in the eighteenth century. The facade has twenty-seven windows. The drawing-room sports a wallpaper which was hand-painted, representing fields of rice in China. Throughout the garden, there are ponds and sculptures. 

Jean-Joseph-Pierre Pascalis (1732-1790), a supporter of the monarchy, was hiding in this chateau when he was arrested in and killed during the French Revolution. A few decades later, in 1807, Pauline Bonaparte (1780–1825), sister of Napoleon (1761-1821), had an affair with Louis Nicolas Philippe Auguste de Forbin (1779-1841) in this chateau. During her stay, she asked her staff to silence the frogs and cicadas with long poles.

It later belonged to the inventor of mignardises, a small petit four. His son, Sauveur Mignard, remodelled it. In 1858, it was purchased by Émile Rigaud (1824-1890), who served as the Mayor of Aix-en-Provence from 1849 to 1863. 

It still belongs to one of Émile Rigaud's descendants, Sabine Sechiari, who founded the non-profit organization Association des bastides et des jardins de Provence et du Sud-Est (English: "Association of bastides and gardens of Provence"). It has received funding for its restoration from Vieilles Maisons Françaises, a non-profit organization for the restoration of old buildings in France.

Heritage significance
It has been listed as a monument historique since 1995.

References

Châteaux in Bouches-du-Rhône
Monuments historiques of Aix-en-Provence